Zinc finger and BTB domain-containing protein 7B is a protein that in humans is encoded by the ZBTB7B gene.
ZFP67 is an early growth response gene that encodes a zinc finger-containing transcription factor that binds to the promoter regions of type I collagen genes (e.g. COL1A1; MIM 120150) and has a role in development.[supplied by OMIM]

See also 
 Zbtb7

References

Further reading

External links 
 

Transcription factors